Michael Patrick Smith  (born 19 January 1942), known professionally as Michael Crawford, is an English actor, comedian, and singer.

Crawford is best known for playing both the hapless Frank Spencer in the sitcom Some Mothers Do 'Ave 'Em and the title role in the musical The Phantom of the Opera. His acclaimed performance in the latter earned him both the Laurence Olivier Award for Best Actor in a Leading Role in a Musical and Tony Award for Best Actor in a Leading Role in a Musical. He has received international critical acclaim and won numerous awards during his acting career, which has included many film and television performances as well as stage work on both London's West End and on Broadway.

Crawford has also published the autobiography Parcel Arrived Safely: Tied With String. Since 1987, he has served as the leader and public face for the British social cause organization the Sick Children's Trust.

Early life and education
Crawford was brought up by his mother, Doris Agnes Mary Pike, and her parents, Montague Pike and his wife, Edith (née Keefe or O'Keefe), in what Crawford described as a "close-knit Roman Catholic family". His maternal grandmother was born in County Londonderry, Ireland (now Northern Ireland), and lived to be 99 years old. His mother's first husband, Arthur Dumbell "Smudge" Smith, who was not his biological father, was killed, aged 22, on 6 September 1940 during the Battle of Britain, less than a year after they married. Sixteen months after Smith's death, Crawford was born, the result of a short-lived relationship, and given his mother's surname, which was that of her first husband.

During his early years, Crawford divided his time between the army camp in Wiltshire, where he and his mother lived during the war, and the Isle of Sheppey in Kent. The isle was where his mother had grown up and where Crawford would later live with his mother and maternal grandparents. He attended St Michael's, a Catholic school in Bexleyheath which was run by nuns whom Crawford later described as not being shy in their use of corporal punishment. At the end of the Second World War, his mother remarried, this time to a grocer, Lionel Dennis "Den" Ingram. The couple moved to London, where Crawford attended Oakfield Preparatory School, Dulwich, where he was known as Michael Ingram. His mother's second marriage was abusive, according to Crawford.

Acting career

Career beginnings
Crawford made his first stage appearance in the role of Sammy the Little Sweep in his school production of Benjamin Britten's Let's Make an Opera, conducted by Donald Mitchell, which was then transferred to Brixton Town Hall in London. He auditioned, unsuccessfully, for the role of Miles in Britten's The Turn of the Screw - the role being given to another boy soprano, David Hemmings; but it appears that Crawford's audition sufficiently impressed Britten as in 1955 he hired him to play Sammy, alternating with David Hemmings, in another production of Let's Make an Opera, this time at the Scala Theatre in London. He also participated in the recording of that opera (as Michael Ingram, singing the role of Gay Brook) made that same year, conducted by the composer.

In 1958 he was hired by the English Opera Group to create the role of Jaffet in another Britten opera, Noye's Fludde, based on the story of Noah and the Great Flood. Crawford remembers that it was while working in this production that he realised he seriously wanted to become an actor. It was in between performances of Let's Make an Opera and Noye's Fludde that he was advised to change his name, "to avoid confusion with a television newsman called Michael Ingram[s] who was registered with British Equity".

He went on to perform in a wide repertoire. Among his stage work, he performed in André Birabeau's French comedy Head of the Family, Neil Simon's Come Blow Your Horn, Bernard Kops's Change for the Angel, Francis Swann's Out of the Frying Pan, Shakespeare's Julius Caesar, Coriolanus, and Twelfth Night, Oscar Wilde's The Importance of Being Earnest, The Striplings, The Move After Checkmate and others. At the same time, he appeared in hundreds of BBC radio broadcasts and early BBC soap-operas, such as Billy Bunter of Greyfriars School, Emergency - Ward 10, Probation Officer, and Two Living, One Dead. He appeared as the cabin boy John Drake in the television series Sir Francis Drake, a 26-part adventure series made by ITC starring Terence Morgan and Jean Kent. He made his film debut in 1958 with leading roles in two children's films, Blow Your Own Trumpet and Soapbox Derby, for The Children's Film Foundation in Britain.

In 1961 Michael Crawford appeared in an episode of One Step Beyond called "The Villa" in which he played a character experimenting with strobe lights. Crawford appears in the only surviving episode of the 1960 British crime series Police Surgeon alongside Ian Hendry. This series would spawn the much better-known The Avengers.

Early adult career
At age nineteen, he was approached to play an American, Junior Sailen, in the film The War Lover (1962), which starred Steve McQueen. To prepare for the role, he would spend hours listening to Woody Woodbury, a famous American comedian of the time, to try to perfect an American accent. After The War Lover, Crawford briefly returned to the stage and, after playing the lead role in the 1963 British film Two Left Feet, was offered a role in the British television series, Not So Much a Programme, More a Way of Life, as the Mod-style, tough-talking, motorbike-riding Byron. It was this character that attracted film director Richard Lester to hire him for the role of Colin in The Knack ...and How to Get It in 1965. The film was a huge success in the UK.

Lester also cast him in the film adaptation of Stephen Sondheim's musical A Funny Thing Happened on the Way to the Forum, and How I Won the War, which starred Roy Kinnear and John Lennon (during the filming of which he lived in London with Lennon and his first wife Cynthia, and Gabrielle Lewis). Crawford starred in The Jokers (directed by Michael Winner) with Oliver Reed in 1967.

Broadway debut
In 1967, he made his Broadway début in Peter Shaffer's Black Comedy with Lynn Redgrave (making her début as well) in which he demonstrated his aptitude and daring for extreme physical comedy, such as walking into walls and falling down staircases. While working in the show, he was noticed by Gene Kelly and was called to Hollywood to audition for him for a part in the film adaptation of the musical Hello, Dolly!. He was cast and shared top billing with Barbra Streisand and Walter Matthau. Despite becoming one of the highest-grossing films of 1969, it failed to recoup its $25 million budget at the box office. It went on to win three Academy Awards, was nominated for a further four (including Best Picture), and is now considered to be one of the greatest musical films ever.

His later films fared less successfully, although Alice's Adventures in Wonderland, in which he played the White Rabbit, enjoyed moderate success in the UK. After performing in Alice's Adventures in Wonderland, and with offers of work greatly reduced and much of his salary from Hello, Dolly! lost, reportedly due to underhanded investments by his agent, Crawford faced a brief period of unemployment, in which he helped his wife stuff cushions (for their upholstery business) and took a job as an office clerk in an electric company to pass the time between. During this difficult time, his marriage fell apart and divorce followed in 1975.

Some Mothers Do 'Ave 'Em
Crawford's acting career took off again after he appeared on the London stage in the farce No Sex Please, We're British, in which he played the part of frantic chief cashier Brian Runnicles. His performance led to an invitation to star in a BBC television comedy series about a childlike and eternally haphazard man who causes disaster everywhere he goes. Crawford was not the first choice for the role of Frank Spencer in Some Mothers Do 'Ave 'Em. Originally, the part had been offered to comedy actor Ronnie Barker but after he and Norman Wisdom had turned it down, Crawford took on the challenge, adopting a similar characterisation to that which he used when playing Brian Runnicles. Cast alongside him was actress Michele Dotrice in the role of Frank's long-suffering wife, Betty, and the series premiered in 1973.

Some Mothers Do 'Ave 'Em soon became one of the BBC's most popular television series. Initially, only two series were produced, from 1973 to 1975, while the show's creators felt that it should stop while at its peak. There was a brief hiatus until popular demand saw it revived for a final series in 1978. The immense popularity that followed the sitcom was due perhaps to the unusual amount of physical comedy involved. Crawford said he had always been a fan of comedians such as Charlie Chaplin, Buster Keaton and Laurel and Hardy, as well as the great sight gags employed in the days of silent film, and saw Some Mothers as the ideal opportunity to use such humour himself. He performed all of his own stunts during the show's run, and never used a double.

1970s
While he was playing in Some Mothers Do 'Ave 'Em, Crawford was approached to star in the musical Billy (based on the novel Billy Liar), which opened in 1974 at the Theatre Royal, Drury Lane in London. This was his first leading man role on the West End stage and helped to cement his career as both a singer and showman. The part was demanding, requiring proficiency in both song and dance, and in preparation for the role, Crawford began taking both more seriously, studying singing under the tutelage of vocal coach Ian Adam and spending hours perfecting his dancing capabilities with choreographer Onna White.

Billy gave the many fans of Crawford's portrayal of Frank Spencer an opportunity to see him in a broadly similar role on the stage, and was a considerable hit (904 West End performances). After the closing of Some Mothers Do 'Ave 'Em, Crawford continued to perform in plays and musicals, starring in Flowers for Algernon (1979) in the role of Charley Gordon, based on the book of the same title. He pursued another role on a very short-lived ITV sitcom, Chalk and Cheese, as the slovenly, uncouth Dave Finn. The show did not go over well with his fans: the popularity of Crawford's portrayal of Frank Spencer, and the similar Billy Fisher character, had left him somewhat typecast, to the extent that they could not accept his very different role as Dave Finn. Crawford abandoned the show during its first series and returned to theatre work.

1980s

Condorman
Crawford starred in the 1981 Disney comedy/adventure film Condorman, playing an eccentric American comic book writer and illustrator named Woody Wilkins who is asked by his friend at the CIA to help a Russian woman to defect while acting out the fantasy of bringing his comic book creation, Condorman, to life. Critics panned the film. On their television show, critics Gene Siskel and Roger Ebert featured the film in their round-up of the year's worst films pointing out the less-than-special effects such as the visible harness and cable used to suspend Condorman in the air and the obvious bluescreen effect. The film performed poorly at the box office but years later gained a cult following among Disney fans.

Barnum
Also in 1981, Crawford starred in the original London production of Cy Coleman's Barnum (1981) as the illustrious American showman P.T. Barnum. He trained at the Big Apple Circus School in New York City to prepare for the ambitious stunts, learning to walk the tight-rope, juggle and slide down a rope from the rafters of the theatre. After further training for the second opening of Barnum, he was awarded a British Amateur Gymnastics Association badge and certificate as a qualified coach.

Barnum opened on 11 June 1981 at the London Palladium, where it ran for 655 performances. Crawford and Deborah Grant headed the cast. It was well-received, becoming a favourite of Margaret Thatcher as well as the Queen Mother. Crawford earned his first Olivier Award for Best Actor in a Musical on the London stage. After the initial production of the show, he worked extensively with Torvill and Dean, and can be seen rinkside with them as they received their "perfect six" marks in the 1983 world championships for their 'Barnum' routine.

In 1984 a revival of Barnum opened in Manchester at the Opera House, ending the tour at the Victoria Palace in the West End. In 1986 this production, with a new cast, though still headed by Crawford, was recorded for television and broadcast by the BBC. Crawford's Barnum is one of the longest runs by a leading actor.

The Phantom of the Opera
In 1984, at the final preview of Starlight Express, Crawford happened to run into the show's creator, Andrew Lloyd Webber. Lloyd Webber had met Crawford socially several times and remembered him from his work in Flowers for Algernon. He informed Crawford that he was working on a new project based on a Gaston Leroux novel and wanted to know whether he was interested. Crawford said he was, but the show was still in the early planning stages, and nothing had been decided. Several months passed, during which Lloyd Webber had already created a pitch video featuring his then-wife Sarah Brightman as the female lead Christine, and British rocker Steve Harley as the Phantom, singing the title song in the manner of a contemporary new wave video. Crawford was turned off by that, supposing the songwriter had chosen to do a "rock opera"-inspired spectacle in lieu of a more traditional operatic musical.

Since casting Harley, however, Lloyd Webber had also begun to regret his artistic choices (as stated in the 'Behind the Mask' documentary that he and Cameron MackIntosh agreed that Harley wasn't an actor, nor a large theatre presence, all of which by this point Crawford had vast experience in). As production continued on the show, the bulk of the score was revealing itself to be far more classical and operatic, entirely unsuited to Harley's rough, contemporary voice. Wanting instead a performer with a more classic, melodic voice, as described in the original book, he began yet another search for the perfect actor to play his Phantom. Crawford's landing of the role was due in large part to the coincidence that Sarah Brightman had taken lessons with the same vocal coach as Crawford. She and her husband had arrived early for her lesson, and it was while waiting that they chanced to hear Crawford practising the aria Care Selve, from the opera Atalanta by Handel. Intrigued, Lloyd Webber asked Ian Adam who his student was. Soon after, Crawford was called in for an audition and was hired virtually on the spot.

Many critics were sceptical; Crawford was still largely pigeonholed as the hapless Frank Spencer, and questions were asked about Crawford's ability to manage such a vocally and dramatically demanding role. In 1986, he began his performance in London at Her Majesty's Theatre, continuing on to Broadway in 1988, and then Los Angeles in 1989. He played the role for two and a half years and over 1,300 performances, winning an Olivier Award (Best Actor in a Musical), a Tony Award (Best Performance by an Actor in a Lead Role, Musical), a New York Drama Desk Award, and a Los Angeles Drama Critics Circle Award for Distinguished Achievement in Theatre (Lead Performance).

During the run of Phantom in Los Angeles, Crawford was asked to perform "The Music of the Night" at the Inaugural Gala for President George H. W. Bush in Washington, D.C., on 19 January 1989. At the gala, Crawford was presented with a birthday cake (it was his 47th birthday). On 29 April 1990, after three and a half years and over 1,300 performances later, Crawford left the show for the final time. He admits to having been saddened at his departure, and, during the final Lair scene, altered the Phantom's line to "Christine... I loved you", acknowledging that this was his final performance.

1990s
At the request of Liz Kirschner, wife of film producer David Kirschner, he obtained the role of Cornelius in 20th Century Fox's animated film Once Upon a Forest, which was produced by her husband.

In 1995, Crawford created the high-profile starring role in EFX, the US$70 million production which officially opened the 1,700-seat MGM Grand Theatre in Las Vegas. The Atlantic Theater label released the companion album to EFX. Early into the run, Crawford suffered an accident during a performance (which involved him sliding from a wire hanger from the back of the theatre all the way to the stage and then jumping down  to the stage itself) and left the show to recover from his injury, which resulted in an early hip replacement operation.

In the late 1990s, Michael began a long-term relationship with Natasha MacAller, an American dancer and chef.

2000s to present
In 2001, Crawford sang Baby Mine from Disney's Dumbo on its 60th anniversary VHS and DVD.
Crawford had a short comeback to Broadway as the Count von Krolock in the short-lived musical Dance of the Vampires (2002–03). He originated the role of Count Fosco in Lloyd Webber's The Woman in White, which opened at the Palace Theatre, London in September 2004. However, he was forced to leave the show three months later because of ill health caused by dehydration resulting from the enormous fat-suit he wore during the performance. He spent several months recuperating and was thus unable to reprise the role on Broadway. He learned he was suffering from the post-viral condition myalgic encephalomyelitis (ME), which debilitated him for six years.

He later moved to New Zealand briefly, both to be near his daughter and her family in Australia and to convalesce from his illness.

In 2006, Crawford attended the Gala Performance of the stage version of The Phantom of the Opera on Broadway at the Majestic Theatre to celebrate the show's becoming the longest-running musical in Broadway history (surpassing the run of Cats). He was delighted with it, stating this was the first time he had been an audience member of any of the shows he had done.

On 23 October 2010, Crawford attended the celebratory 10,000th performance of The Phantom of the Opera in London alongside composer Andrew Lloyd Webber. Crawford spoke of his own memories of the first performance 24 years ago, and was then presented, along with Lloyd Webber, with a special cake to commemorate the landmark achievement.

Beginning with previews in February 2011, Crawford originated the part of the Wizard in the new Andrew Lloyd Webber/Tim Rice musical version of The Wizard of Oz at the London Palladium, which had its official opening on 1 March 2011. He stated on This Morning: Sunday, on 14 August 2011, that he had signed on for a further six months in the show. He left the production on 5 February 2012; the same day as co-star Danielle Hope played her final performance as Dorothy. From 14 February, Russell Grant took over the role.

On 2 October 2011 Crawford made a special appearance during the finale of The Phantom of the Opera at the Royal Albert Hall — a fully staged production of the musical at the famous London venue – marking 25 years since the show received its world premiere. Although reunited with Sarah Brightman, he did no real singing as he had just finished performing in a matinee of The Wizard of Oz at the London Palladium.

In February 2016 the BBC announced that Crawford and Dotrice would be reprising their roles in a one-off special of Some Mothers Do 'Ave 'Em, to be broadcast as part of the Sport Relief charity fundraiser event. The special aired on 18 March 2016.

Crawford starred in the new West End musical The Go-Between which premiered on 27 May 2016 at Apollo Theatre. He appeared in the 60th anniversary performance of Britten's Noye's Fludde in London in 2018, performing the Voice of God, and recalled in a BBC Radio 3 interview Benjamin Britten's valuable support in his early career.

Concert tours
Crawford has performed many concert tours in the US, Canada, the UK, Australia and New Zealand, beginning with The Music of Andrew Lloyd Webber in 1992. In 1998, Crawford began Michael Crawford: Live In Concert tour around the United States. One performance, done at the Cerritos Arts Center in Los Angeles, was filmed and broadcast on PBS for their annual fundraiser.

In 2006, he made a small concert tour of Australia and New Zealand, as well as a one-night benefit to open the LaSalle Bank Theatre in Chicago. He has also done various Michael Crawford International Fan Association (MCIFA) exclusive concerts around the US. The MCIFA makes contributions to many charities.

Charity work
Since the late 1980s, Crawford has affiliated himself with various charities, particularly for the good of children. He is a patron of the Lighthouse Foundation in Australia, and has also been President of the Sick Children's Trust since 1987.

Personal life 

Michael has three daughters. He has two daughters with Gabrielle, born in 1966 and 1968. The eldest daughter was the subject of a court case in 1969.

Accolades
 Laurence Olivier Award for Best Actor in a Leading Role in a Musical for his performance of the title role in Barnum (1981)
 Awards won for his performance in the title role in The Phantom of the Opera:
 Laurence Olivier Award for Best Actor in a Leading Role in a Musical (1986)
 Tony Award for Best Actor in a Leading Role in a Musical (1988)
 Drama Desk Award for Outstanding Actor in a Leading Role in a Musical (1988)
 Outer Critics Circle Award for Best Actor in a Leading Role in a Musical (1988)
 Los Angeles Drama Critics Circle Award for Distinguished Achievement in Theatre (Lead Performance) (1990)
 Awards won for his performance as Count Fosco in The Woman in White:
 Variety Club of Great Britain Award for Outstanding Stage Performance (2004)
 Theatregoers' Choice Award for Best Actor in Supporting Role in a Musical (2004) voted by on-line readers of WhatsonStage.com
 Named Show Business Personality of the Year by the  Variety Club of Great Britain
 Voted No. 17, ahead of Queen Victoria, in the 100 Greatest Britons (2002) poll sponsored by the BBC
 BroadwayWorld UK Award for Best Featured Actor in a Musical for The Wizard of Oz (2011)
 Received Aardman Slapstick Visual Comedy Legend Award (2016) – cited works include Some Mothers Do ‘Ave ‘Em

Crawford was appointed Officer of the Order of the British Empire (OBE) in 1988 and Commander of the Order of the British Empire (CBE) in the 2014 New Year Honours for charitable and philanthropic services, particularly to children's charities.

Acting credits

Theatre

Film

Discography

Solo albums

Video albums

Cast albums

 A Funny Thing Happened on the Way to the Forum (1966)
 Hello, Dolly! (1969)
 Billy (1974)
 Flowers for Algernon (1980)
 Barnum (1981)
 The Phantom of the Opera (1987)
 Highlights from The Phantom of the Opera (1987)
 Once Upon a Forest (1993)
 EFX (1995) AUS #100
 The Woman in White (2004)
 WALL-E (2008) (excerpts from Hello, Dolly!)
 The Wizard of Oz (2011)

Guest appearances

 Save the Children: Christmas Carols and Festive Songs (1988) – "Let's Pretend"
 The Premiere Collection: The Best of Andrew Lloyd Webber (1988) – "The Music of the Night"
 Showstoppers (1991) – "Fugue for Tinhorns" (with Barry Manilow & Hinton Battle)
 A Christmas Spectacular of Carols and Songs (1992) – "Let's Pretend"
 Back to Broadway (1993) – "The Music of the Night" (with Barbra Streisand)
 David Foster: The Christmas Album (1993) – "O Holy Night"
 The London Symphony Orchestra Performs the Works of Tim Rice and Andrew Lloyd Webber (1994) – "The Phantom of the Opera" and "Jesus Chris Superstar" Suites
 The Andrew Lloyd Webber Collection (1999) – "The Phantom of the Opera" (with Sarah Brightman)
 Millennium Chorus: The Greatest Story Ever Sung (2000) – "How Still How Silent"
 Child of the Promise: A Musical Story Celebrating The Birth of Christ  (2000) – "After All These Years", "Zacharias & Gabriel Recitative" (with Russ Taff), "He Will Prepare the Way"
 My Favorite Broadway: The Love Songs (2001) – "The Music of the Night"
 Standing Ovation: The Greatest Songs from the Stage (2012) – "The Music of the Night" (with Susan Boyle)

See also
 List of British actors

References

External links
 
 
 Michael Crawford – BBC Guide to Comedy
 Michael Crawford profile at BroadwayWorld International Database
 Broadway World interview with Crawford
 "Crawford Talks Return to the Stage"
 "Phantom of the Opera Tour Ends Two-Decade Run: Phantoms from Gleason to Crawford Talk Tour Closing"

1942 births
20th Century Studios contract players
British expatriates in New Zealand
Commanders of the Order of the British Empire
Drama Desk Award winners
English male film actors
English male television actors
English male musical theatre actors
English male radio actors
English male voice actors
English male comedians
English people of Irish descent
English male stage actors
English tenors
English Roman Catholics
Laurence Olivier Award winners
People from Salisbury
Male actors from Wiltshire
Masked actors
Metro-Goldwyn-Mayer contract players
Tony Award winners
Living people
Musicians from Wiltshire
British male comedy actors